Cacotherapia ponda is a species of snout moth in the genus Cacotherapia. It was described by Harrison Gray Dyar Jr. in 1907 and is known from the US state of California.

References

Cacotherapiini
Moths described in 1907